Monte Bello, Italian for beautiful mountain, can refer to:

Monte Bello Open Space Preserve in California, part of the Midpeninsula Regional Open Space District
A wine label of Ridge Vineyards
Monte Bello (Guayaquil), a neighborhood of Guayaquil, Ecuador
Monte Bello, a barangay in Kananga, Leyte, The Philippines
Monte Bellos, a homestead in Western Australia
Monte Bello seahorse (Hippocampus montebelloensis)
Monte Bello Ridge, an alternate name for Black Mountain in Santa Clara County, California

See also
Montebello (disambiguation)